USS Leopard (IX-122), an Armadillo-class tanker designated an unclassified miscellaneous vessel, was a United States Navy ship named for the leopard, a large and ferocious spotted cat of southern Asia and Africa.  Her keel was laid down as William B. Bankhead on 5 October 1943 by Delta Shipbuilding Company, in New Orleans, Louisiana, under a Maritime Commission contract (T. Z-ET1-S-C3). She was renamed Leopard on 27 October 1943, launched on 15 November 1943 sponsored by Mrs. William B. Bankhead, acquired by the Navy 24 December 1943, and commissioned on 26 December 1943.

Originally designed to carry dry cargo, Leopard was converted to a tanker, and departed Key West, Florida, on 18 January 1944 for the southwest Pacific.  Arriving Bora Bora, Society Islands, on 27 February, she performed harbor fueling operations out of Australia and New Guinea until mid-April when she sailed for the Admiralty Islands. For the rest of the war, Leopard continued harbor fueling duties in the vicinity of New Guinea.

Following V-J Day, the tanker departed Seeadler Harbor on 30 August 1945 and arrived Manila Bay on 9 September where she performed similar services. Leopard remained in the Philippines until she sailed for the United States on 19 March 1946 arriving Norfolk, Virginia, on 11 May. She decommissioned there 21 June 1946 and was delivered to the War Shipping Administration the same day for disposal. Her name was struck from the Naval Vessel Register on 3 July 1946.

References 

Armadillo-class tankers
Unclassified miscellaneous vessels of the United States Navy
Ships built in New Orleans
1943 ships